Acalypha integrifolia is a species of flowering plant in the botanical family Euphorbiaceae. It is locally used as a medicinal plant. Leaf decoctions are drunk to treat intestinal worms.

Geographic distribution 
Acalypha integrifolia occurs in Madagascar, Reunion and Mauritius. It is relatively common.

others
This plant is a host plant of the butterfly Neptis dumetorum.

References

External links 
PROTA4U on Acalypha integrifolia
All The Plants

integrifolia
Flora of Madagascar
Plants used in traditional African medicine
Flora of the Mascarene Islands